Legislative elections were held in Honduras on 11 October 1942.

Results

References

Elections in Honduras
Honduras
1942 in Honduras
October 1942 events
Election and referendum articles with incomplete results